The Ministry of Foreign Affairs (abbreviated МВнР, or MVnR) of Bulgaria is the ministry charged with overseeing the foreign relations of Bulgaria. It has been in existence since shortly after the Liberation of Bulgaria, with the first minister stepping into office on 17 July 1879. Until 1947, it was known as the Ministry of Foreign Affairs and Religious Denominations.

Since May 2017 till April 2021 Minister of Foreign Affairs was Ekaterina Zakharieva. As of December 2021 Minister of Foreign Affairs is Teodora Genchovska.

List of ministers

See also
List of current foreign ministers
List of foreign ministers in 2017

References

External links
 Official website 

Foreign Affairs
Foreign relations of Bulgaria
Bulgaria
Bulgaria, Foreign Affairs
1879 establishments in Bulgaria